Ealing Charity Christmas Card Shop is an annual pop-up shop which sells Christmas cards in Ealing,  West London to support charities.

The shop was founded in 1985 by Sue Green and the late Pat Harvey.  They were mothers of young children and found that there was no shop of this type within a convenient traveling distance of where they lived in Ealing. Based upon a charity Christmas shop in Green's home town of Norwich, the pair contacted local charity organisers and set up a shop staffed by volunteers.  The enterprise has since sold about five million cards, raising over £800,000 for over 100 charities.

In 2011, the shop operated out of vacant premises in Bond Street, Ealing following the refurbishment of the shop's original home at the YMCA in St Mary's Road. Since 2014, the shop has been based at the Church of Christ the Saviour in New Broadway, Ealing.

In 2015, that year's shop was opened by local celebrities and dignitaries including John Sergeant, Stephen Pound and Rupa Huq. In 2016, the shop was opened on 2 November by Ealing MPs Stephen Pound and Rupa Huq. It closed on 20 December.

Locally-based personalities and politicians who have previously opened the shop include Chris Serle, Sir George Young, Glenys Kinnock, John Sergeant, Doc Cox, Gary Wilmot and Angie Bray.

In 2015, after thirty years of operation, Sue Green was recognised with a Points of Light award by then prime minister, David Cameron.

In 2016, she was awarded an MBE in the New Year Honours List.

In 2017, the shop was open on weekdays from 31 October to 19 December. 

In 2018, the shop was open on weekdays from 30 October to 19 December.

In 2019 the shop opened for its 35th year from Tuesday 29 October to Thursday 19 December.  

Because of COVID restrictions in 2020, the shop was unable to use its regular base at the Church of Christ the Saviour. Instead, it had been planning instead to operate on five Saturdays before Christmas at Open Ealing in School Lane, Dickens Yard. However, because of the tighter regulations introduced by the UK Government on 5 November 2020 Open Ealing could not be used. On 17 November The Ealing Charity Christmas Card Shop launched an online catalogue and email ordering service.  

In 2021 Ealing Charity Christmas Card Shop was able open for its 37th year from Tuesday, 9 November until Saturday, 18 December 2021 at the Church of Christ the Saviour, New Broadway, Ealing, London W5 2XA. 
 

For 2022, its 38th year the shop was scheduled to be open from 1 November to 19 December, from 10am to 4pm.

References

Charities based in London
Organisations based in the London Borough of Ealing